Frankford Township may refer to:
 Frankford Township, New Jersey
 Frankford Township, Mower County, Minnesota

Township name disambiguation pages